Enid Charles (29 December 1894 – 26 March 1972) was a British socialist, feminist and statistician who was a pioneer in the fields of demography and population statistics.

She was born Dorothy Enid Charles in Denbigh, Wales. She obtained a bachelor's degree in mathematics, economics and statistics at Newnham College, Cambridge University, where she became friends with Dorothy (Dodo) Crowther, sister of James Crowther. She gained a Ph.D. in physiology from the University of Cape Town, South Africa.

Charles met the conscientious objector Lancelot Hogben while at Cambridge; they married in 1918. Out of a dozen or so socialist and feminist couples in Britain in the early 20th century, Charles was the only wife to keep her name.  The couple who had two sons and two daughters, separated in 1953 and divorced in 1957.

Charles worked on fertility rates and nuptiality for the Dominion Bureau of Statistics in Canada. In 1934, Charles projected drastic decline in population of the United Kingdom should the fertility rates continue to fall. These results led her to speak out against the then commonly accepted principle of eugenics. She subsequently worked as a Regional Adviser in Epidemiology and Health Statistics and as a Population Statistics Consultant for the World Health Organization in Singapore and New Delhi.

She died in Torquay, England, in 1972, aged 77.

Bibliography

See also
Leslie Hogben, granddaughter of Enid

References 

1894 births
1972 deaths
British statisticians
Women statisticians
British demographers
Alumni of Newnham College, Cambridge
University of Cape Town alumni
British feminists
People from Denbigh
British socialist feminists